Mavis G. Sanders is an American research scientist studying education and Black families. She is senior research scholar of Black Children and Families with Child Trends.

Education 
Sanders received a Bachelor's in Urban Affairs with a concentration in political science from Barnard College/Columbia University in 1987. She received a Master's in Sociology from Stanford University in 1992 and a Ph.D. in Social Sciences, Policy, and Educational Practice from Stanford in 1995.

Career 
From 1987 through 1989 Sanders taught social studies and English in Papua New Guinea in the Peace Corps.

Sanders was faculty at Johns Hopkins University and a research scientist at Hopkins' Center for Research on the Education of Students Placed at Risk. She was director of Hopkins' Urban Education program and assistant director of the National Network of Partnership Schools. In 2011, she received Johns Hopkins Alumni Association Excellence in Teaching Award.

She was a professor of education at the University of Maryland, Baltimore County (UMBC) and from 2017 to 2021 was director of UMBC’s Sherman Center for Early Learning in Urban Communities.

In 2021 she moved to Washington DC research institute Child Trends as a senior research scholar.

Reception 
In 2003 Pamela S. Angelle reviewed Schooling Students Placed at Risk (2000) in the Journal of Education for Students Placed at Risk.

In reviewing Sanders' 2005 Building School-Community Partnerships (reprinted in 2015), Soo Hong, writing in the Harvard Educational Review, said educators would find her work "a refreshing change." Hong notes that Sanders "makes two important distinctions as she lays the groundwork for her book: that community is not constrained by the geographical boundaries of neighborhoods, and that parental involvement — a part of community involvement — is not the focus of her book" and that the book challenges educators to work in ways that "move beyond a mere focus on parental involvement" and offers multiple concrete actionable ways to do so.

In 2020, Reuben Jacobson reviewed Sanders' latest book "Reviewing the Success of Full-Service Community Schools in the US: Challenges and Opportunities for Students, Teachers, and Communities" (with Claudia Galindo) in the School Community Journal.

Research interests 
Sanders studies education, racial equity, youth development, Black families and children, and full-service community schools.

Notable research 
Dr. Sanders has authored over 60 publications including:
 
 

 
 
 
Hrabowski, F. & Sanders, M. (2015, Winter). Strengthening Diversity in the Teaching Force: One University’s Perspective. Thought & Action (The NEA Higher Education Journal), 32, 101-116. 
Sanders, M. (2015). Leadership, Partnerships, and Organizational Development: Exploring Components of Effectiveness in Three Full-service Community Schools. School Effectiveness and School Improvement, 27(2), 1-21.doi.org/10.1080/09243453.2015.1030432 
Galindo, C., Sanders, M., & Abel, Y. (2017). Transforming Educational Experiences in Low Income Communities: A Qualitative Case Study of Social Capital in a Full-Service Community School. American Educational Research Journal, Centennial Edition, 54(1S), 140-163.doi.org/10.3102/0002831216676571

References

External links 

American women academics
Stanford University alumni
Barnard College alumni
Johns Hopkins University faculty
University of Maryland, Baltimore County faculty
Living people
Year of birth missing (living people)